Dinjiška is a village in Croatia. It is connected by the D106 highway.

References

Populated places in Zadar County
Pag (island)